William Toomer (January 12, 1831 – December 27, 1901) was an American soldier who fought in the American Civil War. Tommer received his country's highest award for bravery during combat, the Medal of Honor. Toomer's medal was won for his gallantry at the Battle of Vicksburg, Mississippi on May 22, 1863. He was honored with the award on July 9, 1894.

Toomer was born in Dublin, Ireland. He joined the US Army from Chicago in August 1862, and mustered out with his regiment in June 1865.

Medal of Honor citation

See also
List of American Civil War Medal of Honor recipients: T–Z

References

1837 births
1899 deaths
American Civil War recipients of the Medal of Honor
Irish-born Medal of Honor recipients
Irish emigrants to the United States (before 1923)
People of Illinois in the American Civil War
Union Army officers
United States Army Medal of Honor recipients
Burials at Graceland Cemetery (Chicago)
Military personnel from Dublin (city)